Jitendra Durga Maharaj was a Fijian sports administrator. He had been mainly involved with the Fiji Football Association, holding positions of Secretary and Executive Director of the Association. He is credited with the introduction of the Battle of the Giants soccer tournament in 1978. 

Other positions that he held were:
 chef de mission of the Fiji team to the 2002 Manchester Commonwealth Games
 South Pacific Games Chief Executive 2003
 Treasurer of Oceania Football Confederation from 1990 
 Match Commissioner of the Oceania U-20 World Cup 2001 Qualifiers

He died on 24 December 2006.

References

Year of birth unknown
Fijian Hindus
2006 deaths
Fijian referees and umpires